Guanay Municipality (Aymara: Wanay) is the second municipal section of the Larecaja Province in the  La Paz Department, Bolivia. Its seat is Guanay.

Geography 
The Cordillera Real traverses the Guanay Municipality. Some of the highest peaks of the range,  Chachakumani and Ch'iyar Juqhu, lie within the borders of the municipality. More mountains are listed below:

Languages 
The languages spoken in the Guanay Municipality are mainly Spanish, Aymara and Quechua.

Ref.: obd.descentralizacion.gov.bo

See also 
 Janq'u Quta

References 

 www.ine.gob.bo / census 2001: Guanay Municipality

Municipalities of La Paz Department (Bolivia)